Alfina Sukhanova (born 1 January 1944) is a Soviet alpine skier. She competed in three events at the 1968 Winter Olympics.

References

1944 births
Living people
Soviet female alpine skiers
Olympic alpine skiers of the Soviet Union
Alpine skiers at the 1968 Winter Olympics
Sportspeople from Novosibirsk